Granton railway station served the district of Granton, Edinburgh, Scotland from 1846 to 1925 on the Edinburgh, Leith and Newhaven Railway.

History 
The station opened on 19 January 1846 by the Edinburgh, Leith and Granton Railway. The platform had a station building on it and a canopy. To the south of the station was the signal box. The station closed on 1 January 1917 but reopened on 1 February 1919, before closing permanently 2 November 1925.

References

External links 
Edinburgh, Granton Harbour, Middle Pier, Railway Station on Canmore

Disused railway stations in Edinburgh
Former Caledonian Railway stations
Granton, Edinburgh
Railway stations in Great Britain opened in 1846
Railway stations in Great Britain closed in 1917
Railway stations in Great Britain opened in 1919
Railway stations in Great Britain closed in 1925
1846 establishments in Scotland
1925 disestablishments in Scotland